All American Boy may refer to:

Music
All American Boy (Rick Derringer album), 1973
All American Boy (Steve Grand album), 2015 
"All-American Boy", a 2013 song by Steve Grand
"The All American Boy", a 1958 song by Bobby Bare

Other uses
The All-American Boy (film), a 1973 film by Charles Eastman
All American Boy (novel), a 2005 novel by William J. Mann
Jack Armstrong, the All-American Boy, a 1933-51 radio serial